Barry Du Bois (born 4 August 1960) is an Australian designer, building expert, television presenter and author. Du Bois is currently a co-host and design/building expert on Network 10's lifestyle program The Living Room.

Du Bois first appeared on reality renovation show The Renovators as a building mentor and judge.

Education 
Du Bois attended Chipping Norton Public School and completed Year 10 at Liverpool Boys High School where he excelled at all sports.

Career 

In 1976 Du Bois began an apprenticeship in carpentry and joinery, and gained a building certificate in 1980. He was mentored by architects and started to design and build homes as a speculative builder in 1979. Du Bois ran a successful design, building and property development business until retirement in 2005. During that time he served a term as President of the Master Builders Association NSW Eastern Suburbs and acted as an expert building witness for NSW courts and the Department Fair Trading tribunal.

In 2011, Du Bois hosted TEN's renovation reality series, The Renovators.

In 2012, Du Bois joined lifestyle program The Living Room on Network Ten, alongside Amanda Keller, Chris Brown and Miguel Maestre. Heading up the renovations team, Du Bois assists home-owners in need of some expert help.

Du Bois was nominated to the Board of RUOK? Day. He is also a passionate advocator for the Cancer Council Australia and a firm believer in environmental sustainability.

In May 2018, Du Bois and Miguel Maestre released an autobiographical book called Life Force about Du Bois's family, friendships, living with cancer and includes nutritional advice and recipes by Maestre.

In July 2021, Du Bois announced that he was running for the Australian Senate as an independent candidate in New South Wales, but withdrew in April 2022, citing health.

Personal life
Du Bois was born in Sydney, in the suburb of Liverpool, and is now living in the suburb of Bondi.

Du Bois met his partner Leonie Carol Tobler in Bondi in 1992. They married in 1999 and their twins, a son and daughter, were born on 1 June 2012.

Du Bois was diagnosed with plasmacytoma, a cancer of the immune system, in 2010. He underwent successful therapy, but the cancer had already destroyed the vertebrae at the top of his spine. He received a titanium implant in his spine. In 2017, Du Bois announced that the cancer had returned as multiple myeloma.

Filmography

Books 
 Life Force by Barry Du Bois and  Miguel Maestre, Paperback (2018) :

References 

1960 births
Living people
Australian television presenters
Australian interior designers
People with multiple myeloma